WYAI is or was the callsign of several different stations:

WYAI, the current (2002–present) WYAI
WRDG, the WYAI from 1994–2002
WALR-FM, the WYAI from 1989–1994